Admiral Hall may refer to:

John L. Hall Jr. (1891–1978), U.S. Navy admiral
John Talbot Savignac Hall (1896–1964), British Royal Navy rear admiral
Mary Fields Hall (born 1934), U.S. Navy rear admiral
Norman B. Hall (1886–1962), U.S. Coast Guard rear admiral
Reginald Hall (1870–1943), British Royal Navy admiral
Thomas F. Hall (born 1939), U.S. Navy rear admiral
Victor W. Hall (fl. 1970s–2020s), U.S. Navy rear admiral
William Hutcheon Hall (c. 1797–1878), British Royal Navy admiral

See also
Admiral King-Hall (disambiguation)
Theodore Hallett (1878–1956), British Royal Navy vice admiral